The Lund University School of Economics and Management (LUSEM) or Ekonomihögskolan i Lund is a business school at Lund University in Lund, Sweden. The educational quality is certified by EQUIS, AMBA, and AACSB.

It was founded and financed by Holger Crafoord.

Rankings
Lund University is highly ranked in international comparisons. Lund University is consistently ranked among the Times Higher Education World University Rankings in recent years. In 2019, Lund University was placed 98th, and in the Business and Economics ranking LUSEM was placed 80th.

Education

The Lund University School of Economics and Management offers the following Bachelor of Science programs:

Business and Economics
Information Systems
International Business
Economy and Society

The Lund University School of Economics and Management offers the following Master of Science programs:

Accounting and Auditing
Data Analytics and Business Economics
Economic Development and Growth
Economic Growth, Population and Development
Economics
Entrepreneurship and Innovation
European and International Trade and Tax Law
Finance
Information Systems
Innovation and Global Sustainable Development
International Marketing and Brand Management
International Strategic Management
Management
Managing People, Knowledge and Change

Student organizations
LINC - Lund University Finance Society, established in 1991, is the primary society for students interested in finance at Lund University. In 2019, LINC had a total of 1,800 members. LINC is the leading finance society in Sweden and one of the most prominent organizations of its kind in Northern Europe. The organization aims to provide members with a skillset to pursue a successful career in finance.

LINC has a strong heritage, noteworthy alumni at top financial institutions, and a successful track record of organizing finance-related events including Investment Banking Forum.

Notable alumni

Sven Otto Littorin, Former Minister for Employment (has not graduated)
Mikael Eriksson, CEO ÖhrlingsPricewaterhouseCoopers Sweden
Bertil Ohlin, developed the Heckscher-Ohlin model on international trade and received the Nobel Memorial Prize in Economic Sciences in 1977.
Torsten Lyth, CEO Ernst & Young Sweden
Eva Rooth, CEO Feelgood
Christian W. Jansson, CEO Kappahl
Lars-Johan Jarnheimer, CEO Tele2
Anders Lidbeck, CEO Telelogic
Bo Strandberg, CEO AddNode
Joen Magnusson, CEO Beijer
Sten K. Johnson, CEO Midway Holding AB
Fredrik Palmstierna, CEO SäkI AB
Fredrik Arp, former CEO Volvo Personvagnar AB
Hans Pihl, CEO Deloitte Sweden
Håkan Jeppsson, CEO Inwido

See also
List of business schools in Scandinavia
List of universities in Sweden

References

External links
Lund University School of Economics and Management - Official site

University departments in Sweden
Lund University
Business schools in Sweden